Mike Manley (born July 21, 1988 in Penn Yan, New York) is an American professional lacrosse player for Chrome Lacrosse Club in the Premier Lacrosse League and the Georgia Swarm of the National Lacrosse League.

Professional MLL career
Manley was selected with the 3rd pick of the 2012 Major League Lacrosse Collegiate Draft by the Rochester Rattlers. In his rookie season Manley, appeared in 11 games and picked up 35 ground balls. In his second season of play Manley scored 3 goals while managing to get 20 ground balls. During the 2014 season Manley scored 8 goals while obtaining a single assist and 37 ground balls good enough to earn the 2014 Warrior Defensive Player of the Year award. Manley's 2015 season was cut off short due to a season-ending injury and only appeared in 5 games where he picked up 25 ground balls and obtained a single assist. In 2018 Manley went with the team in the move to Dallas. He appeared in 7 games and recorded 1 goal and 17 ground balls.

Professional NLL career
Manley was drafted with the 32nd pick of the fourth round in 2012 National Lacrosse League Entry Draft by the Philadelphia Wings. Manley played for the Wings for two seasons appearing in 31 games while managing to gather 10 points and 127 loose balls. He spent his 2015 season with the New England Black Wolves. Manley played for the expansion New York Riptide in the 2019-20 season, before being traded in the offseason to the Rochester Knighthawks.

Manley signed a two year contract with the Georgia Swarm on August 17, 2022.

Professional PLL career
On October 22, 2018 it was announced that Manley was joining the Premier Lacrosse League for the summer 2019 season. On March 4, 2019 it was announced that Manley was joining the Chrome Lacrosse Club.

Prep and college career
Manley was a five-year letterman at Penn Yan Academy, where he went on to play in the state finals as a freshman, and the semi-finals as a sophomore, junior and senior. At Duke, Manley started in 74 of his 75 career games.

Personal 
Manley works full time as a New York State Trooper.

NCAA Statistics

MLL Statistics

PLL Statistics

NLL Statistics

References

1988 births
Living people
Rochester Rattlers players
Dallas Rattlers players
American lacrosse players
People from Penn Yan, New York
Duke Blue Devils men's lacrosse players
Lacrosse players from New York (state)
Philadelphia Wings players
New England Black Wolves players
Rochester Knighthawks players
New York Riptide